Ridin' High is an album by British musician Robert Palmer. It was his eleventh solo studio album, released in 1992 and reached number 32 in the UK Albums Chart and number 173 on the US Billboard 200. This album contains music heavily influenced by vocal and jazz standards and featured the minor hit "Witchcraft", which reached number 50 in the UK. The album featured three tracks from Palmer's Don't Explain album two years earlier.

Track listing
 "Love Me or Leave Me" (Walter Donaldson, Gus Kahn) – 3:44
 "(Love Is) The Tender Trap" (Sammy Cahn, Jimmy Van Heusen) – 2:35
 "You're My Thrill" (Sidney Clare, Jay Gorney) – 3:57
 "Want You More" (Robert Palmer) – 4:07
 "Baby, It's Cold Outside" (Frank Loesser) – 3:30
 "Aeroplane" (Robert Palmer) – 3:00
 "Witchcraft" (Cy Coleman, Carolyn Leigh) – 3:17 (UK #50)
 "What a Little Moonlight Can Do" (Harry M. Woods) – 2:41
 "Don't Explain" (Billie Holiday, Arthur Herzog, Jr.) – 2:27
 "Chance" (Robert Palmer, Alan Mansfield, Saverio Porciello) – 2:41
 "Goody Goody" (Johnny Mercer, Matty Malneck) – 2:51
 "Do Nothin' Till You Hear from Me" (Duke Ellington, Bob Russell) – 3:44
 "Honeysuckle Rose" (Fats Waller, Andy Razaf) – 2:49
 "No, Not Much" (Robert Allen, Al Stillman) – 2:22
 "Ridin' High" (Cole Porter) – 2:15
 "Hard Head" (Eddie Curtis, Johnny "Guitar" Watson) – 3:05

Chart performance

Personnel 

 Robert Palmer – lead and backing vocals, arrangements (6, 10, 14), acoustic piano (10)
 Derek Smith – acoustic piano (1-3, 5, 7–9, 11–13, 15, 16)
 Alan Mansfield – acoustic piano (6)
 William Bryant – keyboards (14)
 Dennis Budimir – guitar (1-3, 5, 7–9, 11-15), ukulele (8)
 Bucky Pizzarelli – guitar (2, 11)
 Saverio Porciello – guitar (6, 10)
 Jay Berliner – banjo (8)
 Johnny Winter – guitar (16), backing vocals (16)
 Chuck Domanico – bass (1-3, 7–9, 11, 13)
 Lincoln Goines – bass (5, 16)
 Frank Blair – bass (6, 14)
 Guy Pratt – bass (6, 10)
 Andy Simpkins – bass (12, 15)
 Larry Bunker – drums (1-3, 7–9, 11–13, 15)
 Jimmy Madison – drums (5, 16)
 Dony Wynn – drums (6, 14)
 Mauro Spina – drums (10)
 John Bilezikjian – oud (4), dumbek (4)
 Cyro Baptista – percussion (6)
 Earl A. Dumler – oboe (4)
 Phil Bodner – clarinet (8)
 Dave Bargeron – trombone (8)
 Richard Gibbs – trombone (14)
 Warren Luening – trumpet (1, 5, 11)
 Lew Soloff – trumpet (8)
 Demo Morselli – trumpet (12)
 Chuck Findley – trumpet (14)
 Clare Fischer – arrangements and conductor (1-5, 7–9, 11–13, 15, 16)
 Morris Repass – orchestra manager
 Carnie Wilson – lead vocals (5)

Production 
 Teo Macero – producer
 Robert Palmer – co-producer, art direction
 David Harper – executive producer
 Arne Frager – engineer (1-5, 7–9, 11–13, 15, 16)
 Glen Kolotkin – additional engineer
 Pino "Pinaxa" Pischetoia – mixing (1, 2, 4–8, 10-16), engineer (6, 10, 14)
 Eric "ET" Thorngren – mixing (3, 9)
 Ian Ross, Bill Smith Studio – design
 Charles Dickins – other photography
 Fabio Nosotti – main photography
 Gianfranco Ferre – clothing

References

External links
 

1992 albums
Robert Palmer (singer) albums
Albums arranged by Clare Fischer
Albums produced by Teo Macero
Vocal jazz albums
EMI Records albums
Orchestral jazz albums
Albums produced by Robert Palmer (singer)